"Harbor Lights", is a popular song with music by Hugh Williams (the pseudonym of exiled Austrian composer Will Grosz) and lyrics by Northern Irish songwriter Jimmy Kennedy. The song was originally recorded by Roy Fox & his Orchestra with vocal by Barry Gray in London January 29, 1937. Another famous early version was recorded by American singer Frances Langford in Los Angeles September 14, 1937, and was published again in 1950.

The melody of the song is done in a Hawaiian style, 18 years before this island became a state. several versions featured a ukulele, and a steel guitar.

Lyrics
Kennedy's lyrics describe the sight of harbour lights in the darkness, which signal that the ship carrying the singer's sweetheart is sailing away. The lonely singer hopes that the lights will someday signal the sweetheart's return.
Apparently the lyricist Jimmy Kennedy was driving from London (UK) down to Southampton on the South coast along the A3 road which led south to Portsmouth. As he neared the coast a fog descended and he was confused about the direction. He saw some lights on a pub and decided to stop. The pub was called The Harbour Light. Some time later he wrote the lyric and music was added. The song Harbour Lights was recorded by the Platters and many others. A blue plaque is today fixed to the wall of the pub.
http://www.michaelcooper.org.uk/C/harbourl.htm

Versions
The song has been recorded by many artists; charting versions were recorded by Sammy Kaye, Guy Lombardo, Bing Crosby, Ray Anthony, Ralph Flanagan, Elvis Presley, and Ken Griffin. Other versions were recorded by The Ink Spots, Lawrence Welk, LaVern Baker, The Platters, Engelbert Humperdinck, Willie Nelson, Jerry Lee Lewis, Vera Lynn, Clyde McPhatter, Arthur Tracy and Jon Rauhouse. A Polish version titled "Portowe światła", with lyrics by Herold (pseudonym for Henryk Szpilman), was recorded in 1938 by Mieczysław Fogg (released as Syrena Electro 2035), shortly after World War II by Tadeusz Miller (released as Melodje 118), and by Irena Santor in 1966 (released as Muza XL0311).

The biggest-selling version was recorded by the Sammy Kaye orchestra. The recording was released by Columbia Records as a 78 rpm single and a 45 rpm single. The record first reached the Billboard charts on September 1, 1950, and lasted 25 weeks, peaking at #1.

The Guy Lombardo orchestra recording of August 24, 1950 was released by Decca Records. The record first reached the Billboard charts on October 6, 1950, and lasted 20 weeks, peaking at #2.

The Bing Crosby recording of September 5, 1950 with Lyn Murray and his Orchestra and Chorus was released by Decca Records. The record first reached the Billboard charts on November 3, 1950, and lasted 11 weeks, peaking at #10.

The Ray Anthony orchestra recording was released by Capitol Records. The flip side was "Nevertheless".  The record first reached the Billboard charts on October 20, 1950, and lasted 15 weeks on the chart, peaking at #15.

The Ralph Flanagan orchestra recording was released by RCA Victor Records. The record first reached the Billboard charts on October 27, 1950, and lasted 5 weeks, peaking at #27.

The Ken Griffin recording was released by Columbia Records. The record reached the Billboard charts on October 20, 1950, and lasted only one week, charting at #27.

The Marco T. y Los Gatos Montañeros recording was released by Tulsan Records Private on September 14, 1987.

The song was also recorded by Pat Boone on the 1957 album Howdy!

Rudy Vallée recorded his rendition in 1937.

In 1960, The Platters recording peaked at #8 on the Billboard Hot 100 charts and #15 on the Hot R&B Sides chart. Overseas, this version, peaked at #11 in the UK. The Platters version featured the recorded sounds of ship bells ringing, plus the sounds of ocean waters splashing, which is heard at both the beginning and the ending of the song, before it fades out.

In later years, Ace Cannon recorded an instrumental version for his 1994 album Entertainer.

In popular culture

In an episode of M*A*S*H ("Your Retention, Please"), Klinger (Jamie Farr), while nursing a broken heart, plays the song over and over again on a jukebox. In the final scene, he smashes the record.

References

1937 songs
Songs with lyrics by Jimmy Kennedy
Songs with music by Wilhelm Grosz
Columbia Records singles
Decca Records singles
Capitol Records singles
RCA Records singles
Mercury Records singles
Bing Crosby songs
Elvis Presley songs
The Platters songs
Willie Nelson songs
Vera Lynn songs
Number-one singles in the United States
Guy Lombardo songs